Drahomír Jirotka (20 September 1915 – 21 February 1958) was a Czech ice hockey player. He competed in the men's tournament at the 1936 Winter Olympics.

References

1915 births
1958 deaths
Czech ice hockey forwards
Olympic ice hockey players of Czechoslovakia
Ice hockey players at the 1936 Winter Olympics
HC Sparta Praha players
Sportspeople from Prostějov
Czechoslovak ice hockey forwards